The Irish League in season 1992–93 comprised 16 teams, and Linfield won the championship.

League standings

Results

References
Northern Ireland - List of final tables (RSSSF)

NIFL Premiership seasons
1
Northern